Hin Namno National Park (or Hin Nam No) is in Boualapha District, Khammouane Province, Laos. The park borders Phong Nha-Kẻ Bàng National Park of Vietnam to the east and Nakai-Nam Theun National Park of Laos to the north. Hin Namno National Park was created by prime ministerial decree in January 2020. It is managed by the Ministry of Agriculture and Forestry (MAF).

Hin Namno's distinctive feature is its karst formations. Were this park and Phong Nha-Kẻ Bàng to be combined into one contiguous park, it would be one of the largest protected karst regions in the world.

In early-2021, Hin Namno was nominated for inclusion on the International Union for Conservation of Nature (IUCN) Green List of Protected and Conserved Areas. The IUCN Green List  is a global standard for protected area management performance. It is seen as a precursor to a UNESCO World Heritage Site nomination.

Species 
Hin Namno is home to 1,520 species of vascular plants and 536 vertebrate species. Important species living in the reserve include Douc and Francois’s langur, giant muntjac, fruit bat, harlequin bat, great evening bat, wreathed and great hornbills and the sooty babbler.

Habitats 
Certain habitats and forestry in the reserve include evergreens, both mixed deciduous and dipterocarp forest. As Hin Namno lies between the Khammuan limestone belt and the Annamite Range there are many caves and limestone escarpments including the Xe Bang Fai River Cave. It is believed to be one of the largest river caves in the world with passages some 120 meters tall and 200 meters wide, and a subterranean channel seven kilometres long.

Resolutions 
 Pursuance of the Forest Strategy for the Year 2020
 Pursuance of the Forestry Law No. 04/NA, dated 24/12/2007 
 Pursuance of the Law on Wild Animals and Aquatic Resources No. 07/NA, dated24/12/2007.

See also
Protected areas of Laos

References

External links
 A Wildlife and Habitat Survey of Hin Namno NBCA and Adjacent Areas
 

Protected areas of Laos